Vibin Mohanan (born 6 February 2003) is an Indian professional footballer who plays as a midfielder for the Indian Super League club  Kerala Blasters.

Club career

Early life and youth career
When he was nine, Vibin joined the Kerala Police Football Academy in 2012 where he was trained under I.M. Vijayan. In 2017, Vibin was selected into the Kerala Blasters U-15 team where he played for the side in the Hero Junior League. In November 2020, he was loaned to Indian Arrows, an All India Football Federation-owned team that would consist of India under-20 players to give them playing time. He also captained the team during the loan stint. Vibin made his first professional appearance for Indian Arrows on 10 January 2021 against Churchill Brothers as Substitute on second half. He scored his first goal for the Arrows on 2 April 2022 against Real Kashmir.

Kerala Blasters
After spending two seasons on loan with Indian Arrows, Vibin returned to the Blasters. He was included in Kerala Blasters Reserves squad for the 2022 Durand Cup. Vibin made his debut for the side on 19 August 2022 against Sudeva Delhi FC which ended in a draw. He made five appearances for the side and provided one assist during the tournament.

In October 2022, Vibin got promoted into the senior team after he was included in the Blasters squad for the 2022–23 Indian Super League season. He made his first team debut for the Blasters when he came on in the 84th minute during a 4–0 loss against Mumbai City on 8 January 2023. Vibin was included in the Blasters' starting eleven for the first time against Hyderabad on 26 February 2023, which the Blasters lost 1–0, where he played for the entire 90 minutes.

International career

Youth team
In June 2022, Vibin was included in the final 23-member squad of the Indian under-20 national team to participate in the 2022 SAFF U-20 Championship. He made his debut for the side on 27 July in a 2–0 loss against Bangladesh. He made four appearances in the tournamnet and helped his side to win the title for the fourth time in its history.

Career statistics

Club

Honours
India U20
SAFF U-20 Championship: 2022

References

2003 births
Living people
Indian footballers
India youth international footballers
Indian Arrows players
I-League players
Association football midfielders
Kerala Blasters FC Reserves and Academy players
I-League 2nd Division players
Indian Super League players
Footballers from Kerala